A longboard generally designates a longer board variant in various board sports.

 Longboard (skateboard)
 Longboard (surfing)

Longboard may also refer to 

 Long spine board, a piece of pre-hospital emergency medical equipment

See also
 Longboarding
 Longobard, an Anglicization of Lombard